Fronsac is a wine growing region named after the commune of Fronsac on the right bank of the Gironde estuary in Bordeaux. It includes the following communes: La Rivière, St.-Germain-la-Rivière, St.-Aignan, Saillans, St.Michel-de-Fronsac, Galgon, and Fronsac. Canon Fronsac AOC is a sub-appellation contained entirely within Fronsac AOC in the southern area nearest the river Dordogne.

The AOC produces red wines only, which are based primarily on Merlot. The major grape varieties grown, with approximate acreage given in parentheses, are Merlot (almost 80%), Cabernet Franc (almost 15%), and Cabernet Sauvignon (under 10%). The appellation covers 771 ha, with approximately 100 winemakers producing 5 million bottles per year.

References

Bordeaux AOCs
Wine regions